Seth Gukuna (born August 21, 1961) is a member of the National Parliament of the Solomon Islands, representing a constituency in Rennell and Bellona Province. Hon. Gukuna defeated Joses Tuhanuku in 2006. He won his second term in 2010 by a significant margin.  
His was educated in New Zealand and the University of the South Pacific, Fiji. 
He used to work for the Shell Company, SI. 
He also served as Solomon Islands Ambassador to Taiwan during the Ulufa'alu government. He was later recalled by the successive government.

References
Member page on Parliament website

1961 births
Living people
Members of the National Parliament of the Solomon Islands
People from Rennell and Bellona Province
Ambassadors of the Solomon Islands to Taiwan